Ludwig Wilhelm Sachs (29 December 1787 in Groß-Glogau – 17 June 1848 in Königsberg) was a German physician.

From 1807 studied medicine at the universities of Königsberg, Berlin and Göttingen, receiving his doctorate at the latter institution with the dissertation-thesis "De Humorum corporis animalis vi vitali" (1812). He later served as a physician in war-time hospitals in Königsberg, and in 1816 obtained his habilitation. In 1818 he became an associate professor at Königsberg, followed by a full professorship in 1826. In 1832 he was named director of the medical clinic, then in 1840 received the title of Geheimen Medizinalrat (private medical advisor).

Published works 
 Ueber Wissen und Gewissen. Reden an Aerzte, 1826 – On knowledge and belief.
 Versuche zu einem Schlußworte über S. Hahnemann’s homöopathisches System, nebst einigen Conjecturen, 1826 – Essay on Samuel Hahnemann's homeopathic system, together with some conjectures. 
 Handwörterbuch der practischen Arzneimittellehre; with Friedrich Philipp Dulk (3 volumes, 1830–39) – Handbook of practical materia medica.
 Die China und die Krankheiten, welche sie heilt, 1831.
 Das Quecksilber: ein pharmakologisch-therapeutischer Versuch, 1834 – On quicksilver; a pharmacological-therapeutic experiment.
 Das Opium: ein pharmacologisch-therapeutischer Versuch, 1836 – On opium; a pharmacological-therapeutic experiment.
 "Spiritual wives"; William Hepworth Dixon (2 volumes, 1868 in English) with Sachs' Darstellung der pietistischen Umtriebe in Königsberg (Representation of pietistic machinations in Königsberg).

References 

1787 births
1848 deaths
People from Głogów
Academic staff of the University of Königsberg
University of Königsberg alumni
University of Göttingen alumni
19th-century German physicians